For information about U.S. Federal tax brackets, see:

 Income tax in the United States
 Tax Rate schedules